Central European Time (CET) is a standard time of Central- and parts of Western Europe which is 1 hour ahead of Coordinated Universal Time (UTC).
The time offset from UTC can be written as UTC+01:00.
It is used in most parts of Europe and in a few North African countries.
CET is also known as Middle European Time (MET, German: MEZ) and by colloquial names such as Amsterdam Time, Berlin Time, Brussels Time, Madrid Time, Paris Time, Rome Time, Warsaw Time or even Romance Standard Time (RST).

The 15th meridian east is the central axis for UTC+01:00 in the world system of time zones.

As of 2023, all member states of the European Union observe summer time (daylight saving time), from the last Sunday in March to the last Sunday in October.
States within the CET area switch to Central European Summer Time (CEST, UTC+02:00) for the summer.

In Africa, UTC+01:00 is called West Africa Time (WAT), where it is used by several countries, year round.
Algeria, Morocco, and Tunisia also refer to it as Central European Time.

Usage

Usage in Europe

Current usage 
As of 2017, Central European Time is currently used in Albania, Andorra, Austria, Belgium, Bosnia and Herzegovina, Croatia, Czech Republic, Denmark, France, Germany, Hungary, Italy, Liechtenstein, Luxembourg, Malta, Monaco, Montenegro, Netherlands, North Macedonia, Norway, Poland, San Marino, Serbia (including Kosovo, partially recognised as an independent country), Slovakia, Slovenia, Spain (except Canary Islands), Sweden, Switzerland and Vatican City.

History 
 1884
 Serbia starts using CET.
 1 October 1891
 Austro-Hungarian Empire adopts CET. At first railways and post offices, cities such as Prague and Budapest, but not Vienna. (present-day Austria, Czech Republic, Croatia, Hungary, Slovakia, Slovenia and some other regions)
 1 April 1893
 The German Empire unified its time zones to use CET (MEZ).
 Malta uses CET.
 Vienna (then part of Austro-Hungarian Empire) starts using CET.
 1 November 1893
 Italy starts using CET. 
 1894
 Switzerland switches from UTC+00:30 to CET
 Liechtenstein introduces CET.
 Denmark adopts CET.
 1895
 Norway adopts CET.
 1900
 Sweden adopts CET.
 1904
 Luxembourg introduces CET, but leaves 1918.
 1914
 Albania adopts CET.
 1914–1918
 During World War I CET was implemented in all German-occupied territories.
 1920
 Lithuania adopts CET (but subsequently rescinded in 1940) and 1998−1999 again.
 1922
 Poland adopts CET.
 1940
 Under German occupation:
 The Netherlands was switched from UTC+00:20 to CET.
 Belgium was switched from UTC+00:00.
 Luxembourg was switched from UTC+00:00.
 France, which had adopted Paris time on 14 March 1891 and Greenwich Mean Time on 9 March 1911, was switched to CET.
 Spain switched to CET.
After World War II Monaco, Andorra and Gibraltar implemented CET.

Portugal used CET in the years 1966–1976 and 1992–1996.

United Kingdom
The time around the world is based on Universal Coordinated Time (UTC) which is roughly synonymous with Greenwich Mean Time (GMT). From late March to late October, clocks in the United Kingdom are put forward by one hour for British Summer Time (BST). Since 1997, most of the European Union aligned with the British standards for BST.

In 1968 there was a three-year experiment called British Standard Time, when the UK and Ireland experimentally employed British Summer Time (GMT+1) all year round; clocks were put forward in March 1968 and not put back until October 1971.

Central European Time is sometimes referred to as continental time in the UK.

Other countries 
Several African countries use UTC+01:00 all year long, where it is known as West Africa Time (WAT), although Algeria, Morocco and Tunisia use the term Central European Time despite being located in North Africa.

Between 2005 and 2008, Tunisia observed daylight saving time. Libya also used CET during the years 1951–1959, 1982–1989, 1996–1997 and 2012–2013.

For other countries see UTC+01:00 and West Africa Time.

Discrepancies between official CET and geographical CET 

Legal, political and economic, as well as physical or geographical criteria are used in the drawing of time zones so official time zones rarely adhere to meridian lines. The CET time zone, were it drawn by purely geographical terms, would consist of exactly the area between meridians 7°30′ E and 22°30′ E. As a result, there are European locales that despite lying in an area with a "physical" or "nominal" UTC+01:00 time, actually use another time zone (UTC+02:00 in particular – there are no "physical" UTC+01:00 areas that employ UTC+00:00). Conversely, there are European areas that have gone for UTC+01:00, even though their "physical" time zone is UTC (typically), UTC−01:00 (westernmost Spain), or UTC+02:00 (e.g. the very easternmost parts of Norway, Sweden, Poland and Serbia). On the other hand, people in Spain still have all work and meal hours one hour later than France and Germany despite sharing the same time zone. Historically Gibraltar maintained UTC+01:00 all year until the opening of the land border with Spain in 1982, when it followed its neighbour and introduced CEST. The following is a list of such "incongruences":

Areas located within UTC+01:00 longitudes using other time zones 
These areas are located between 7°30′ E and 22°30′ E ("physical" UTC+1)

Areas using UTC+02:00 
 The westernmost part of Greece, including the cities of Patras, Ioannina and the island of Corfu
 The westernmost parts of the Bulgarian provinces of Vidin and Kyustendil
 The westernmost part of Romania, including most of the area of the counties of Caraș-Severin, Timiș (capital Timișoara), Arad, and Bihor, as well as the westernmost tips of the counties of Mehedinți and Satu Mare
 The westernmost tip of Ukraine, near the border with Hungary and Slovakia, at the Ukrainian Transcarpathian Oblast (Zakarpattia Oblast), essentially comprising the city of Uzhhorod and its environs. (Although CET is used as local, non-official time in Transcarpathia).
 Western Lithuania, including the cities of Klaipėda, Tauragė, and Telšiai
 Western Latvia, including the cities of Liepāja and Ventspils
 The westernmost parts of the Estonian islands of Saaremaa and Hiiumaa, including the capital of the Saare County, Kuressaare
 The southwestern coast of Finland, including the city of Turku; also the Åland islands (of Finnish jurisdiction) – the Åland islands are the westernmost locale applying EET in the whole of Europe
 The northwesternmost part of Finland, including Kilpisjärvi and Kaaresuvanto.
 The Russian exclave of Kaliningrad Oblast, excluding however its easternmost slice (the city of Nesterov is east of 22°30′ E, but that of Krasnoznamensk is not)

Areas located outside UTC+01:00 longitudes using UTC+01:00 time 
These areas are located either west of 7°30′ E or east of 22°30′ E (outside nominal UTC+01:00)

Areas between 22°30′ W and 7°30′ W (nominal UTC−01:00) 
 The westernmost part of mainland Spain (Galicia, e.g. the city of A Coruña); Cape Finisterre and nearby points in Galicia, at 9°18′ W, are the westernmost places of CET in Spain.
 The Norwegian island of Jan Mayen lies entirely within this area and extends nearly as far west as Cape Finisterre, with its western tip at 9°5′ W and its eastern tip at 7°56′ W.
Western Morocco including the city of Casablanca, at 7°35′ W. CET usage in Morocco extends as west as 13°10′ W.
The entirety of Western Sahara with its western tip at 17°6′ W and its eastern tip at 8°40′ W.

Areas between 7°30′ W and 7°30′ E (nominal UTC+00:00) 
 Andorra
 Belgium
 France, with the small exception of two separate easternmost parts of the mainland, one along eastern Alsace, incl. Strasbourg and the other in parts of the Alpes-Maritimes department, as well as the island of Corsica. Overseas departments of France use local times.
 The very westernmost part of Germany, incl. the cities of Saarbrücken, Düsseldorf, Cologne, Aachen, and Trier
 The absolutely westernmost part of Italy, incl. the cities of Aosta in Aosta Valley and Cuneo in Piedmont
 Luxembourg
 Monaco
 Netherlands
 The westernmost part of Norway, incl. the cities of Bergen and Stavanger
 Spain, except for the westernmost part of the mainland (see above) and the Canary Islands (which are further than 7°30′ W and use UTC+00:00).
 Gibraltar
 The part of Switzerland west of Bern (inclusive), also incl. cities such as Basel, Geneva, Lausanne, and Fribourg
Most of Algeria including its capital Algiers.

Areas between 22°30′ E and 37°30′ E (nominal UTC+02:00) 

 The easternmost part of North Macedonia, including the city of Strumica
 The easternmost part of Serbia, in the Pirot District, including the city of Pirot, and small easternmost parts of Bor District.
 The easternmost tips of Hungary and Slovakia, bordering to the north and south respectively the Ukrainian Transcarpathian Oblast (Zakarpattia Oblast), a bit to the east of Vásárosnamény, Hungary – Uzhhorod, Ukraine (both at 22°18′ E) line
 The easternmost part of Poland, including the cities of Lublin and Białystok
 The northeast of Sweden, in the Norrbotten province, including the cities of Kalix and Haparanda
 The northeast of Norway, lying north of Finland, roughly coinciding with the county of Finnmark. The easternmost town in Norway, Vardø, lies at 30°51′ E, which is so far east, so as to be east even of the central meridian of EET (UTC+02:00), i.e. east of Istanbul and Alexandria. The sun reaches its highest point at 10:56 (when not DST), although the sun does not vary so much in height at the latitude 70°N. The Norwegian–Russian and the Polish-Belarusian border are the only places where CET (UTC+1/+2) borders Moscow time (UTC+03:00), resulting in a two hours time change (or one hour in summer) for the travellers crossing that border.
 There is a "tri-zone" point (where UTC+01:00, UTC+02:00, and UTC+03:00 meet, winter times) at the Norway–Finland–Russia tripoint near Muotkavaara. During the summer Finland and Russia both have UTC+03:00.

See also 
 Summer time in Europe
 Other countries and territories in UTC+1 time zone

References

External links 
German Time Act
Dutch Time Act
List of countries using CET (Central European Time)

Time zones
Time in Europe
Geography of Central Europe